Joslyn Fox is the stage name of Patrick Allen Joslyn (born July 27, 1986), an American drag performer most known for competing on the sixth season of RuPaul's Drag Race.

Career
Joslyn Fox competed on the sixth season of RuPaul's Drag Race where she placed sixth after being eliminated in the tenth episode. Hanne Low ranked her number 19 in Screen Rant list of "13 Queens Eliminated Too Soon (And 7 Who Stayed Too Long)". In 2022, her impersonation of The Real Housewives of New Jersey's Teresa Giudice ranked number one on WatchMojo's Top 10 Underrated Snatch Game Performances on RuPaul's Drag Race.

Personal life
Joslyn lives in Worcester, Massachusetts as of 2021. He was born to Suzanne Allen Joslyn.

Filmography

Film

Television

References

Living people
American drag queens
LGBT people from Massachusetts
People from Worcester, Massachusetts
Joslyn Fox
1990 births